Adarsh Nagar is a neighborhood in the northern part of Visakhapatnam City, India. It falls under the local administrative limits of Greater Visakhapatnam Municipal Corporation. National Highway 16 passes by this area. Adarsh Nagar is located near to Arilova, Ravindra Nagar and Visalakshi Nagar.

The area is in Madhurawada Zone along with the Indira Gandhi Zoological Park and National Highway 16 and is well-connected with all parts of the city.

References

Neighbourhoods in Visakhapatnam